Rhonda Revelle is an American softball coach and former collegiate pitcher, who is the current head coach for Nebraska. Revelle played at Nebraska from 1981 to 1983, reaching the inaugural Women's College World Series. She later led the Huskers to the 1998 Women's College World Series, becoming one of three people to reach the WCWS as a player and a head coach, and the first to do so at their alma mater.

Coaching career

Nebraska
Revelle was hired as Nebraska's fifth head coach in 1993 and is currently the school's all-time wins leader. She has led the Cornhuskers to the NCAA Tournament 20 times, reaching the Women's College World Series in 1998, 2002, and 2013.

On July 10, 2019, Revelle was placed on paid administrative leave while school administration investigated complaints of verbal and emotional abuse against players. On August 30, 2019, Revelle was reinstated as head coach.

Head coaching record

References

External links
 

Female sports coaches
American softball coaches
Living people
Softball players from Oregon
Nebraska Cornhuskers softball players
Nebraska Wesleyan Prairie Wolves softball coaches
Cal State East Bay Pioneers softball coaches
San Jose State Spartans softball coaches
Nebraska Cornhuskers softball coaches
Year of birth missing (living people)